Winger may refer to:

 Winger (surname), a list of people so named
 Winger (band), an American hard rock band
 Winger (album), the band's self-titled debut album
 Winger (novel), a 2013 book by Andrew Smith
 Winger (sports), a position on the extreme left and right sides in many sports
 Winger (association football)
 Winger (ice hockey)
 Winger (rugby league)
 Winger (rugby union)
 Winger (webcomic)
 Winger, Minnesota, a city in the United States
 Winger Township, Polk County, Minnesota
 Tata Winger, a van produced by Tata Motors
 a recurring character in the Garrett P.I. fantasy book series